Charles Michael Rickett (born 13 June 1963) is a British former racing driver.

Rickett was born in London and educated at Stowe School. In 1998 he co-founded V12 Telecom, suppliers of telecommunications services to UK businesses (Voice & Data, SIP, VoIP, Audio & Video Conferencing, High Speed Internet Access, Mobile & SMS).

Rickett competed in the British Formula 3 Championship from 1988 to 1990, winning the 1990 British Formula Three season National class with 10 wins, 13 pole positions and 3 lap records. A three time competitor in 24 Hours of Le Mans: 1991 (Chamberlain Engineering, Spice Engineering, DNF), 1992 (Kremer Racing, Porsche 962, 11th) and 1994 (Bristow Motorsport, Porsche 911 Carrera RSR, DNF). He was elected to the British Racing Drivers' Club in 1994.

References

See also
 1991 24 Hours of Le Mans
 1992 24 Hours of Le Mans
 1994 24 Hours of Le Mans
 1990 British Formula Three season

1963 births
Living people
British racing drivers
24 Hours of Le Mans drivers
British Formula Three Championship drivers
World Sportscar Championship drivers
People educated at Stowe School